Then and Now with Andy Cohen is an American television series starring Andy Cohen that premiered on December 13, 2015, on the Bravo cable network. The three-part limited series features Cohen remembering the most important pop culture events that happened in three years – 1989, 1994, and 2000. In every episode the host, along with various guests, discuss "the most influential trends and events that shaped that year and reveal how the past has impacted the cultural nuances of today in unexpected ways."

Episodes

References

External links

 
 
 

2010s American reality television series
2015 American television series debuts
2015 American television series endings
Bravo (American TV network) original programming
English-language television shows
Television series by World of Wonder (company)